A Woman of the Century: Fourteen Hundred Seventy Biographical Sketches, Accompanied by Portraits of Leading American Women, in all Walks of Life is a compendium of biographical sketches of American women. It was published in 1893 by Charles Wells Moulton. The editors, Frances E. Willard and Mary A. Livermore, were assisted by a group of contributors.

It is printed from a full-face brevier type on heavy, high-grade, coated book paper. The typography is by Charles Wells Moulton, the engravings and electrotypes by the Buffalo Electrotype and Engraving Company, the press work by the Kittinger Printing Company, the paper by the S. Worthington Paper Company, and the binding by Wm. H. Bork. The volume contains 1,470 biographies, and 1,330 engravings of a uniform size and style. It was sold by subscription only, by the publisher, or an authorized representative.

Introduction
The publication of A Woman Of The Century was undertaken to provide a biographical record of the 19th-century, woman's representation in that era having been recognized. The work was meant to meet the requirements demanded by a discriminating public. It was the most important undertaking of its kind attempted to date. It embraced biographical sketches of women prominently connected with that era of woman's activity—all women considered noteworthy in the church, at the bar, in literature and music, in art and the drama, in science and invention, in social and political reform, in commerce or in philanthropy. It includes women's achievements in various branches of human activity identified with American progress of the day.

Biographies
The biographies are of sufficient fullness to include all facts deserving mention, and taken together, they will afford a complete record of that branch of history referring to American women of the 19th century. It is intended to make each character-sketch a likeness which the world will immediately recognize; and will give the underlying motive to the individual endeavor, the secret of her success, the methods and means of her progress, and the aim and aspiration of her thought. It has been the aim, moreover, to render the Cyclopaedia educational, as well as entertaining and instructive, by making those articles treating of important women and measures constitute noteworthy eras of national history. Each sketch was placed in hands selected from the whole country as best fitted for the task, and then it was revised and arranged by the editors to make one harmonious whole. More than half of the entries are of women who had either never married or had become widowed at a young age and did not remarry.

Portraits
The biographical sketches are accompanied by original half-tone engraving, made direct from a photograph, and executed in the highest form of art. The engravings, thirteen hundred in number, form a valuable picture gallery.

References

Attribution

Bibliography

External links
  

United States biographical dictionaries
1893 non-fiction books
Biographical dictionaries of women